The Saudi Arabia u-17 women's national football team represents Saudi Arabia in international women's football for under 17. The team is controlled by the Saudi Arabian Football Federation (SAFF), the governing body for football in Saudi Arabia.

Colloquially called "the Green Falcons", Saudi Arabia played their first match in 2023 against the Kuwait  -u17 in a 1–4 loss in a friendly  in the Kuwait.

History

In February 2023 the Saudi Arabian Football Federation announce the establishment of the youth  women's team after a long  period (one year) of selecting from different part of the kingdom  local  women's league and even the national women's league. The coroatian coach Stella Gotal  was  selected  to lead  the first ever game for the national team, at 4 mach 20223 the youth  eagle lose their first ever match against the youth Kuwait team  1–4.

Results and fixtures

Legend

2023

Coaching staff

Current coaching staff

Manager history
  Stella Gotal(February 2023 – present)

Players

Current U-17 squad
The following players were named for the two friendly matches against  on 4 and 8 March 2023.

Competitive record

FIFA U-17 Women's World Cup record

AFC U-17 Women's Asian Cup

Arab U-17 Women's Cup

See also
Saudi Arabia women's national football team

References

Arabic women's national under-17 association football teams
Asian women's national under-17 association football teams
national